Labović is a surname. It may refer to:

 Dragan Labović
 Slavko Labović

Serbian surnames